Júlio César Santos Correa (born 18 November 1978), known as Júlio César, is a Brazilian retired professional footballer who played mainly as a central defender, and a manager.

During a professional career that spanned two decades, he played for 16 clubs in 12 countries, but never in Brazil. In the Spanish La Liga, he amassed totals of 125 matches and six goals over six seasons, winning the Champions League with Real Madrid in 2000.

Playing career

Early years
Júlio César was born São Luís, Maranhão. He played youth football in Mexico with Club América, and made his professional debut in Honduras with C.D. Marathón.

Aged 17, Júlio César signed with Spanish side Real Valladolid. He immediately began playing regularly (25 La Liga matches in his first season, helping his team finish seventh and qualify for the UEFA Cup), and attracting interest from bigger clubs.

Real Madrid
Júlio César was bought by Real Madrid in the summer of 1999, appearing regularly in his first year for a team which also included established stoppers Iván Helguera, Fernando Hierro and Aitor Karanka, as well as Iván Campo. He helped them to win the season's UEFA Champions League, although he did not make the list of 18 for the final itself.

After being loaned to A.C. Milan in October 2000, Júlio César quickly left the Italians unsettled, and he returned to Spain with Real Sociedad also on loan. The following off-season, he joined S.L. Benfica on yet another loan.

Bolton
After a one-year spell with FK Austria Wien, Júlio César returned to Valladolid in 2003, again being a starter but seeing the Castile and León side be relegated to Segunda División. He then moved to England's Premier League, signing with Bolton Wanderers.

Júlio César's debut came on 14 August 2004 in a 4–1 home victory over Charlton Athletic. However, after the next game, a 0–2 away defeat to Fulham, he found himself dropped from the starting line-up in favour of Tunisian international Radhi Jaïdi; he also sustained a broken foot against Manchester United at Old Trafford, on Boxing Day, which was his last appearance of the season.

Júlio César's transfer was one of those about which the Stevens enquiry report in June 2007 expressed concerns, because of the apparent conflict of interest between agent Craig Allardyce, his father Sam Allardyce – the Trotters' manager – and the club itself.

Professional journeyman
Júlio César joined Tigres UANL in 2005, and quickly became a key in the Mexican team's defense in both the Liga MX and the Copa Libertadores.  He scored in the match dubbed "Aztecazo", a 4–1 turn-around win against Club América after a 1–3 home loss for the 2005 Apertura.

In July 2006, Júlio César moved to Olympiacos F.C. on a three-year contract. He scored five times from 27 appearances in his first year, being essential to the conquest of the Superleague Greece championship. On 31 October 2006, he scored in a 1–1 away draw against A.S. Roma for Champions League group stage, but his team eventually ranked last.

In the following years, Júlio César represented FC Dinamo București (Romania) and Gaziantepspor (Turkey). Before agreeing to a one-and-a-half-year deal with the latter, he spoke with compatriot and former Real Madrid teammate Roberto Carlos, then at Fenerbahçe SK, asking him for information about the Süper Lig.

Sporting Kansas City
On 14 March 2011, after only a few weeks in Portugal with C.S. Marítimo, 32-year-old Júlio César signed for Major League Soccer club Sporting Kansas City. The terms of the contract were unknown, but general manager Peter Vermes stated that the seasoned veteran would be "a very nice addition to the back line this season".

César was released by Kansas City on 19 November 2012.

Toronto FC
On 14 January 2013, Júlio César joined Toronto FC. He was released two months later, after only appearing in one pre-season game; during his spell in North America, he was deployed mainly as a defensive midfielder.

Coaching career
After retiring, Júlio César obtained his UEFA Pro licence as a manager. He also worked as an ambassador for the Real Madrid Foundation in Brazil.

In January 2019, Julio César was appointed head coach of Spanish amateurs CD Cristo Atlético in Palencia.

Honours
Real Madrid
UEFA Champions League: 1999–2000

Austria Wien
Austrian Football Bundesliga: 2002–03

Tigres
InterLiga: 2006

Olympiacos
Superleague Greece: 2006–07, 2007–08
Greek Football Cup: 2007–08

Sporting Kansas City
U.S. Open Cup: 2012

References

External links

 (part 1)
 (part 2)

1978 births
Living people
People from São Luís, Maranhão
Naturalised citizens of Spain
Brazilian footballers
Association football defenders
Association football midfielders
Association football utility players
Liga Nacional de Fútbol Profesional de Honduras players
C.D. Marathón players
Parrillas One players
La Liga players
Real Valladolid players
Real Madrid CF players
Real Sociedad footballers
Serie A players
A.C. Milan players
Primeira Liga players
S.L. Benfica footballers
C.S. Marítimo players
Austrian Football Bundesliga players
FK Austria Wien players
Premier League players
Bolton Wanderers F.C. players
Liga MX players
Tigres UANL footballers
Super League Greece players
Olympiacos F.C. players
Liga I players
FC Dinamo București players
Süper Lig players
Gaziantepspor footballers
Major League Soccer players
Sporting Kansas City players
Toronto FC players
UEFA Champions League winning players
Brazilian expatriate footballers
Expatriate footballers in Honduras
Expatriate footballers in Spain
Expatriate footballers in Italy
Expatriate footballers in Portugal
Expatriate footballers in Austria
Expatriate footballers in England
Expatriate footballers in Mexico
Expatriate footballers in Greece
Expatriate footballers in Romania
Expatriate footballers in Turkey
Expatriate soccer players in the United States
Expatriate soccer players in Canada
Brazilian expatriate sportspeople in Honduras
Brazilian expatriate sportspeople in Spain
Brazilian expatriate sportspeople in Italy
Brazilian expatriate sportspeople in Portugal
Brazilian expatriate sportspeople in Austria
Brazilian expatriate sportspeople in England
Brazilian expatriate sportspeople in Mexico
Brazilian expatriate sportspeople in Greece
Brazilian expatriate sportspeople in Romania
Brazilian expatriate sportspeople in Turkey
Brazilian expatriate sportspeople in the United States
Brazilian expatriate sportspeople in Canada
Brazilian football managers
Ukrainian Premier League managers
FC Olimpik Donetsk managers
Brazilian expatriate football managers
Expatriate football managers in Spain
Expatriate football managers in Ukraine
Brazilian expatriate sportspeople in Ukraine
Sportspeople from Maranhão